Northwest Passage is a 1981 album by Stan Rogers. "Northwest Passage" compares the singer's own travels across the prairie provinces to the exploratory adventures of Sir John Franklin, Alexander Mackenzie, David Thompson, and Henry Kelsey. "The Idiot" is about a man from the Maritimes working in Alberta who yearns for his home. "Night Guard" deals with modern-day cattle rustling, and "The Field Behind the Plow" addresses the triumphs and tragedies of grain farming in Saskatchewan.

Track listing

Stan Rogers albums
1981 albums